Design theory can refer to any theory relating to design in general.

Design theory may also refer to:
Engineering and industrial design
C-K theory
Design science
C-K theory
Mathematics
Combinatorial design
Block design (including symmetric designs)
Design of experiments
Architecture
Economics
Mechanism design
Theological argument
Intelligent design